The Purga class, Russian designation Project 22120 Purga (blizzard), is a series of ice-strengthened patrol ships designed by Petrobalt Design Bureau and being built by Almaz for the Russian Coast Guard. Project 22120 is a new generation border patrol vessel with an icebreaking capability, allowing it independent navigation in areas with ice thickness up to 0.6 m during winter-spring and up to 0.8 m during summer-autumn season. The class is intended for operations in waters near Sakhalin, Russia's largest island.

Ships
Italics indicate estimates

See also
List of ships of the Soviet Navy
List of ships of Russia by project number

References

External links
Project 22120 at RussianShips

Patrol ship classes
Auxiliary icebreaker classes
Patrol vessels of Russia